Muara Kemumu is a district (kecamatan) of Kepahiang Regency, Bengkulu, Indonesia.

Subdistricts 
 Air Pungur 
 Batu Bandung 
 Batu Kalung 
 Damar Kencana 
 Limbur Baru 
 Pematang Danau Air Les 
 Renah Kurung 
 Sosokan Baru 
 Sosokan Taba 
 Talang Tige 
 Warung Pojok

Districts of Kepahiang Regency